This is a list of Kiribati's museums:

 Te Umanibong

Museums
Kiribati
Kiribati